Hemilea is a genus of tephritid or fruit flies in the family Tephritidae. Hyleurinus is currently considered a synonym of Hemilea.

References

Trypetinae
Tephritidae genera